Thomas Garnier (1776–1873) was an English churchman and botanist, Dean of Winchester from 1840 to 1872.

Life
He was the son of George Garnier of Wickham, Hampshire, educated at Hyde Abbey School. He matriculated at Worcester College, Oxford in 1793; he became a Fellow of All Souls and graduated BCL 1800 and DCL 1850. He was appointed Rector of Bishopstoke, Hampshire, in 1807, retaining this with the deanery.

At Worcester College, Garnier's tutor was Stephen Long Jacob, who is said to have given him a taste for gardening. In 1798, encouraged by Sir Joseph Banks, he joined the Linnean Society of London. He was a founding member of the Hampshire Horticultural Society in 1818. Dean Garnier's Garden in Winchester's cathedral close is named after him. 

In the 1860s, an 'anti-muckabite' campaigner for a sewerage system for Winchester (with the road to the town's first sewerage pumping station later being named after him).

Garnier was a friend of Palmerston and a staunch Whig.

Family
In 1805, Garnier married Mary Parry, daughter of Caleb Hillyer Parry M.D. They had four sons and four daughters. Of the sons:
 
 Thomas Garnier, rowed in the first university boat race, was Dean of Lincoln from 1860 to 1863 and married Lady Caroline Elizabeth Keppel, daughter of William Charles Keppel, fourth Earl of Albemarle, and his wife Elizabeth Southwell, daughter of Edward Southwell, 20th Baron de Clifford.
 John Garnier was a first-class cricketer.

References

External links
 Dean Garnier's Garden
 Martin Tod website

Alumni of Worcester College, Oxford
1776 births
1873 deaths
English botanists
Deans of Winchester
People from the City of Winchester
People from Bishopstoke
Fellows of the Linnean Society of London